The 2020 Formula Regional European Championship was a multi-event, Formula 3 open-wheel single seater motor racing championship held across Europe. The championship featured a mix of professional and amateur drivers, competing in Formula 3 cars that conformed to the FIA Formula 3 regulations for the championship. This was the second season of the championship.

The season started on 31 July at Misano Circuit and concluded on 6 December at Autodromo Vallelunga, after eight meetings. Gianluca Petecof won the drivers' championship at the last race, while Prema Powerteam defended the teams' title. Although Petecof came out victorious in the championship, he did not amass the highest number of race wins, with four compared to his teammates' Arthur Leclerc and Oliver Rasmussen six victories. Patrik Pasma also won four races, and Pierre-Louis Chovet, Dennis Hauger and Ian Rodríguez all won one race each.

Teams and drivers
All teams and drivers competed with the Tatuus-Alfa Romeo F.3 T-318.

 Roman Staněk was scheduled to compete for Prema Powerteam, but withdrew prior to the start of the season. His seat was taken by Jamie Chadwick.
 Brad Benavides was scheduled to compete for DR Formula RP Motorsport, but did not appear in any rounds.
 David Vidales was scheduled to compete for US Racing, but neither the team nor the driver appeared in any rounds.

Race calendar

The initial calendar was announced on 16 September 2019.  After multiple postponements due to the COVID-19 pandemic, a revised calendar was announced on 19 May 2020.  On 3 June 2020 it was announced that the season opener at Hungaroring was pushed back 2 weeks. The current version of the amended calendar was published on 11 June 2020 and saw the round at the Hungaroring replaced by a visit to Misano Circuit.

Championship standings
			
Points were awarded to the top 10 classified finishers in each race. No points were awarded for pole position or fastest lap.

Drivers' standings

Rookies' standings

Teams' standings
Only the two highest finishing cars of one team were eligible for points.

References

External links

Formula Regional European Championship seasons
Formula Regional European Championship
Regional European Championship
Formula Regional European Championship